Matthew "Mattie" Murphy is an Irish former hurling manager and former player. Though he was manager of the Galway senior hurling team on two occasions, was as manager of the Galway minor team that he experienced his greatest success in terms of major titles won.

Born in Turloughmore, County Galway, Murphy was introduced to hurling in his youth. After coming to prominence at underage levels with the Turloughmore club, he later transferred to Gort. A two-time Connacht medal winner with the Gort senior team, Murphy also won two county senior championship medals.

Murphy has been involved at coaching at all levels at club and inter-county for four decades. Between 1992 and 2013 he became the most successful manager in the history of the All-Ireland Minor Championship after guiding Galway to six All-Ireland titles. As manager of the Galway senior team on two separate occasions he won three Connacht titles and two National Hurling League medals.

Honours

Player
Gort
Connacht Senior Club Hurling Championship (2): 1982, 1984
Galway Senior Club Hurling Championship (2): 1981, 1983

Manager
Gort
Galway Senior Hurling Championship (1): 2011, 2014

Galway
Connacht Senior Hurling Championship (3): 1995, 1996, 1999
National Hurling League (2): 1995-96, 2000
All-Ireland Minor Hurling Championship (6): 1992, 1994, 2004, 2005, 2009, 2011

References

 http://www.galwayindependent.com/profiles/profiles/mattie-murphy-%11-galway-minor-hurling-manager/

   

 

 

Year of birth missing (living people)
Living people
Galway inter-county hurlers
Gort hurlers
Hurling managers
Turloughmore hurlers